Charles 'Lefty' Smith (January 5, 1930 – January 3, 2012) was an American ice hockey player and coach most well known for his long tenure with Notre Dame.

Career
A Saint Paul native, Smith spent four years at the nearby University of St. Thomas, playing both hockey and baseball. Smith graduated in 1951 and later returned to earn a master's in guidance and counseling but not before embarking on a short playing career.

In 1953 Smith began his coaching career as an assistant with South Saint Paul Secondary, his old high school. In 1958 he became the head coach of the Packers and spent the next decade leading the team. In that time he posted a record of 201–69–11. His success at the high school level caught the attention of the administration at Notre Dame who chose Smith to become the team's head coach when they rekindled the program in 1968.

Smith's arrival in South Bend coincided with the team becoming a sponsored sport. With Smith behind the bench the Fighting Irish got off to a fast start, going 16–8–3 in their first season and following it up with two good years before they were invited to join the WCHA. After a decent first year Smith led his team to a second-place finish in the powerhouse conference and was awarded the WCHA Coach of the Year for his efforts. In the remaining time the Fighting Irish spent in the WCHA they would typically finish in the lower half of the conference but were able to make the conference tournament each year until 1981. In 1981 Smith's Fighting Irish joined with three other WCHA schools and left to join the CCHA. Smith's squad provided a big surprise in their first season, finishing as the tournament runner-up and tying the team record for most wins in a season (23). After a poor result the following year it was revealed that the program was in jeopardy of ending without an immediate influx of cash. The program was demoted to club status for the 1983–84 season so players would be allowed to transfer without having to sit out a year. When the program returned it did so as an Independent but with reduced scholarships and no recruiting budget the team failed to accomplish much in Smith's final three seasons.

Smith retired as coach in 1987 but kept an office at Notre Dame for the remainder of his life. He died shortly before his 82nd birthday at his home in South Bend from natural causes.

Head coaching record

College

†Total does not include the 1983–84 season because the team played under club status

References

1930 births
2012 deaths
American ice hockey coaches
High school ice hockey coaches in the United States
Notre Dame Fighting Irish ice hockey coaches
Ice hockey coaches from Minnesota
People from Saint Paul, Minnesota
American men's ice hockey defensemen
Ice hockey players from Minnesota